Musculin is a protein that in humans is encoded by the MSC gene.

The protein encoded by this gene is a transcriptional repressor capable of binding an E-box element either as a homodimer or as a heterodimer with E2A in vitro. The encoded protein also forms heterodimers with E2A proteins in vivo. This protein is capable of inhibiting the transactivation capability of E47, an E2A protein, in mammalian cells. This gene is a downstream target of the B-cell receptor signal transduction pathway.

References

Further reading